Pigmentiphaga kullae is a gram-negative, oxidase and catalase-positive, non-spore-forming, rod-shaped bacterium from the genus of Pigmentiphaga which has the ability to decolorize the azo dyes-compound 1-(4'-carboxyphenylazo)-4-naphthol aerobically and uses it as a sole source of carbon and energy.

References

External links
Type strain of Pigmentiphaga kullae at BacDive -  the Bacterial Diversity Metadatabase

Burkholderiales
Bacteria described in 2001